The University of Urbino Carlo Bo (UniUrb) is an Italian university located in Urbino, a walled hill-town in the region of Marche, located in the north-eastern part of central Italy. The University was founded as Law school in 1506 by Guidobaldo da Montefeltro, Duke of Urbino, with the name of "Collegio dei Dottori" ("school of doctors", while in Italy doctor was - and is - a title attributed to anyone with a master's degree).

Starting from the 1960s/70s, under the guidance of Carlo Bo as Rector and in the following years, the University succeeded in buying up numerous derelict buildings in the historic centre of the town (now a UNESCO World Heritage Site), there buildings which have since been restored and used as faculty, department and library buildings. While the student body and faculties gradually increased and developed over time, it was under the long-lasting rectorship of professor Carlo Bo, distinguished humanist and Senator for Life, that the University enjoyed unprecedented growth in size and prestige, prompting the former president of the European Commission, Roy Jenkins, to state that "the University of Urbino is an incisive presence in contemporary thought, contributing in original ways to the cultural and intellectual life of Europe". This was also the period in which architect Giancarlo De Carlo designed and built the University Halls of Residence  and redesigned and modernised several of the university's other buildings.

The University of Urbino currently has six departments and two institutes, over 14,000 students, many of whom are from overseas, about 800 teachers and 400 administrative staff members. Like already explained, the University occupies numerous buildings throughout the historic town centre of Urbino, which is a UNESCO World Heritage Site as whole, and this its de facto Campus. The University also occupies buildings in the close countryside. The main accommodation blocks are situated at a quite short distance from the historic town center.

Urbino has been a centre for culture and studies since the age of Federico da Montefeltro. The Law school was founded in 1506. Nowadays the University of Urbino is also renowned for teaching and research in Sports Science, Humanities, Biology and Computer science, and for the good reputation of its courses.

Organization

Departments
Until 2013 the university was divided into 11 faculties:

 Faculty of Economics
 Faculty of Education
 Faculty of Environmental Sciences
 Faculty of Law
 Faculty of Literature and philosophy
 Faculty of Mathematics, Physics and Natural Sciences
 Faculty of Modern Languages and Literature
 Faculty of Pharmacy
 Faculty of Political Science
 Faculty of Sociology
 Faculty of Sport Sciences

Following the approval of the so-called Gelmini reform in 2009, and starting from the 2013/2014 academic year, the faculty-based organisation was replaced by a department-based structure. It is currently composed of the following departments and institutes:

 Department of Pure and Applied Sciences (DISPeA)
 Department of Communication Sciences, Humanities and International Studies. Cultures, Languages, Literatures, Arts, Media (DISCUI)
 Department of Economics, Society, Politics (DESP)
 Department of Humanities (DISTUM)
 Department of Law (DIGIUR)
 Department of Biomolecular Sciences (DISB)
 Superior Institute of Religious Sciences 'Italo Mancini' (ISSR)
 Institute of Journalism (Ifg)

Ranking

Libraries
The University offers to students and staff a number of libraries making up the University Library System, along with the Foundation 'Carlo and Marise Bo' for Modern and Contemporary European Literature library.

Colleges
The University does not have its own residence halls. However, a number of colleges and dormitories for University of Urbino students are owned and managed by the regional office for the right to academic education. They include four colleges (Vela, Tridente, Aquilone and Serpentine) and one female dormitory (Casa Studentessa) in Urbino, one college located in the scientific campus between Urbino and Fermignano, and a number of rented private accommodation blocks in Pesaro and Fano, paid for by the regional government.

Prizes

The Commandino Medal is awarded by the University every year in recognition of extraordinary contributions in the history of science.

The commission charged with awarding the Commandino medal is appointed by the Director of the International Study Center Urbino and Perspective. Scientific humanism from Piero and Leonardo to the Galilean revolution  and the candidates are chosen according to their contributions to the history of science. It has been awarded annually since 2014, with no award being made in 2019.
The 2021 medal was awarded in 2022.  Awardees: Reviel Netz (Israel, 2014), William René Shea (Canada, 2015), Enrico Gamba (Italy, 2016), Roger Penrose (UK, 2017), Jürgen Renn (Germany, 2018), Monica Ugaglia (Italy, 2020), Victor Pambuccian (Romania, 2021).

The Dal Monte Medal is awarded by the University every year in recognition of contributions in the history of science by young researchers. It was inaugurated in 2022. Awardee: Vincenzo de Risi (Italy, 2022).

Notable people

Alumni
Majlinda Bregu, politician, minister of European Integration of Albania (2009–2013)
Duccia Camiciotti, poet and writer
Lorella Cedroni, political philosopher
Valeria Ciavatta, politician, captain regent of San Marino in 2003–2004 and in 2014
Ivo Mattozzi, historian
Alessia Morani, politician, MP since 2013
Alessandra Moretti, politician, MP (2013–2014) and MEP (2014–2015)
Giuseppe Novelli, biologist
Mario Pappagallo, journalist
Giovanna Trillini, foil fencer, multiple medalist at Olympics and World Championships

Faculty and staff

19th century
Giovanni de' Brignoli di Brünnhoff, botanist, founder of the Orto Botanico "Pierina Scaramella"
Alessandro Serpieri, astronomer and seismologist

20th century
Anna Maria Bisi, archaeologist 
Carlo Bo, literary critic, senator for life (1984–2001), rector of the university (1947–2001)
Sabino Cassese, constitutional lawyer, minister of Public Administration (1993–1994), member of the Constitutional Court of Italy (2005–2014)
Umberto Piersanti, poet and sociologist of literature
Cesare Questa, classicist
Paolo Virno, philosopher and semiologist
Bruno Visentini, politician and business lawyer, minister of Finance (1974–1976 and 1983–1987), minister for Budget (1979) and several times MP

21st century
Khaled Fouad Allam, sociologist and MP (2006–2008) 
Stefano Arduini, linguist
Ilvo Diamanti, political scientist and sociologist
Alessandro Jacchia, television producer
Domenico Losurdo, political theorist and philosopher
Massimo Negrotti, AI sociologist
Mario Vella, philosopher and social theorist

Points of interest
 Orto Botanico "Pierina Scaramella", the university's botanical garden.

See also 
List of early modern universities in Europe
List of Italian universities
Urbino
Urbino European Law Seminar

References

External links

 
University of Urbino
1506 establishments in the Holy Roman Empire
Educational institutions established in the 1500s
Culture in le Marche